Suntan/In Trio is a studio album by Michel Camilo, released in 1986.

Recording, release and reception
The album was recorded in June 1986. It was released by Electric Bird. The Penguin Guide to Jazz commented on the fuzziness of some aspects of the recording quality and wrote that the "Latin component is also more prominent [than on Camilo's earlier albums]".

Track listing 
"We Three" (Michel Camilo, Arnold Evans)
"Tombo in 7/4" (Airto Moreira)
"Las Olas" (Jaco Pastorius)
"(Used to Be) Cha-Cha" (Jaco Pastorius)
"Suntan" (Michel Camilo)

Personnel 
Michel Camilo – piano 
Anthony Jackson – bass 
Joel Rosenblatt – drums 
Dave Weckl – drums

References

External links
 Michel Camilo Discography

1986 albums
Michel Camilo albums